João Soares (born April 25, 1951) is a former professional tennis player from Brazil.

Soares found most of his tennis success while playing doubles. During his career, he won three doubles titles. He achieved a career-high doubles ranking of no. 49 in 1980.

Career finals

Doubles (3 titles, 4 runner-ups)

References

External links
 
 

Brazilian male tennis players
People from Limeira
Living people
1951 births
Pan American Games medalists in tennis
Pan American Games bronze medalists for Brazil
Tennis players at the 1975 Pan American Games
Sportspeople from São Paulo (state)